George Hartgill or Hartgyll (fl. 1594) was an English astronomer.

Hartgill was in considerable repute during Elizabeth I's reign, from his knowledge of the stars and his skill in astrology. He designated himself "minister of the word", and may therefore have been a Protestant preacher.

Hartgill published Generall Calendars in 1594. It was dedicated to William Paulet, 1st Marquess of Winchester, and dated "from my Studie at your Lordshippe's Manor of Checkerell", i.e. Chickerell in Dorset, "the last of August 1594". A second edition was published in 1656 by T. & J. Gadbury.

References

Attribution

English Protestants
16th-century Protestants
16th-century English astronomers
16th-century English writers
16th-century male writers